Autovia was a short lived brand of British car from Coventry existing from 1935 to 1938 with production starting in January 1937. The venture was ambitious and even included setting up a school for chauffeurs. The cars were expensive and it was a market sector well served by other companies. 44 cars were made.

Large luxury cars
The company was created by Riley as a subsidiary to produce large luxury cars and a new factory was built. A 2849 cc 90°V-8, triple camshaft engine was developed from a pair of 1½-litre Riley engine blocks and coupled to a pre selector unit bought from Armstrong Siddeley. One car was fitted with a ZF 4 speed manual box, drive was to the rear wheels through a live axle with worm gear final drive.

Three body types were advertised, a Sports saloon, a Special Saloon with extra leg room at the expense of boot space and a limousine mostly built by Arthur Mulliner of Northampton who were London distributors. The car was also available as a bare chassis.

The venture failed when Riley went bankrupt.  When they were taken over by the Nuffield Organization Autovia was not resurrected.

There were thought to be eight of these cars remaining in 2008.

The limousine was considered remarkable for its width being more than its overall height yet the floors were flat and a tunnel and wells avoided at the back. "The general low set helps stability" said The Times, "the models are well equipped, as they should be for the price".

Specification
The specially designed chassis frame permits a low overall height and low floor line.
In addition to the details in the adjacent box:
 wheels: Dunlop centre-lock wire 3.50" x 19" with nave plates
 tyres: 5.5" section on 19 inch wheels
 suspension by semi-elliptic springs from the two rigid axles is controlled by hydraulic shock absorbers, their resistance is controlled by the driver
 braking on all four wheels is mechanically actuated by rods with wedge operated shoes in 16 inch drums
 steering by worm and nut
 lubrication (of chassis items) is centralised and automatic

Pricing
In a prior announcement 10 October 1936 Victor Riley revealed there would be two models available in addition to the bare chassis all with an automatic clutch, a preselective gearbox and a worm driven back axle. Prices would be:
 chassis £685
 five-seat saloon £975
 limousine £995
The London distributors were Arthur Mulliner Limited of 54 Baker Street.

See also
 List of car manufacturers of the United Kingdom

Notes

References

External links

 Chassis as supplied to coachbuilderspackage would include: spare wheel and tyre, battery, lighting equipment, instrument panel (not visible in drawing)
 1937 saloon by Arthur Mulliner 2007 sale description
 Sporting open two-seater

Defunct motor vehicle manufacturers of England
Coventry motor companies
Vehicle manufacturing companies established in 1935